L'Enfant Sauvage (French for "The Wild Child") is the fifth studio album and major label debut by the French progressive metal/technical death metal band Gojira. It was released 26 June 2012 via Roadrunner Records.

Background
Gojira was going to tour with Lamb of God and Dethklok, but because of Randy Blythe's arrest in the Czech Republic, the tour was cancelled. Gojira subsequently announced a headline tour of their own, which began in January 2013 with support from The Devin Townsend Project and The Atlas Moth.

Writing and composition 
The composition and pre-production of L'Enfant Sauvage were materialized in the southwest of France (Le Studio des Milans). Gojira opted for more "power" and density of sound and emphasized more "epicness" in the structures of the songs. It was co-produced and recorded by Josh Wilbur and Joe Duplantier in New York.

L'Enfant Sauvage is partly inspired by François Truffaut's film of the same name, which tells the true story of Victor of Aveyron, a child who was found alone in the woods with behaviors closer to a wild animal than a civilized human. "We are part of this world. And also there is this idea that an enfant sauvage, a child that grew up in nature, is not confronted with others, with emotions, with guilt and identity, so it would be a state where you are closer to the essence of things."

Frontman, guitarist, and songwriter Joe Duplantier spoke about the meaning of the album by saying, "When you become a musician, you don't have a boss telling you what to do so you have to be very responsible." He goes on to say "With freedom comes responsibility, so I'm asking myself, 'What is freedom? What does it mean to me?' L'Enfant Sauvage reflects on that. There's no answer though. There's just life and questions."

Duplantier expanded on this idea in an interview with The Quietus, explaining that "Since the beginning, since the very first demo even, I've been obsessed with the human condition, the soul, why we are here and is there an answer to that question - the mysteries of life in general. Are we a body? Or are we more than that? And if we are more, then what are we? I'm full of questions, but there are no answers really, just intuition, and a strong intuition that we are more than just flesh and blood".

The song "The Gift of Guilt" was a reflection of Joe Duplantier on the theme of guilt, passed down from generation to generation.

During the recording of the album, Joe Duplantier became a father. "It's a trip man, it's amazing. Of course I'm very influenced by what happened and talking about birth and becoming a dad is not completely disconnected, it's relevant in a way, but everything is influencing me when I'm writing."

Touring and promotion 
On 30 April 2012, the band performed a new song for the forthcoming album, the title track "L'Enfant Sauvage", at Rockstore in Montpellier. Music and lyric videos have been released for five songs off the album: "Explosia", "L'Enfant Sauvage", "The Axe", "Liquid Fire", and "Born in Winter".

The band toured North America in support of the album with the Devin Townsend Project and The Atlas Moth in 2013, and also launched a worldwide tour. In March 2014 the band released a DVD/CD live album of their performance at the Brixton Academy in London on 24 March 2013 entitled Les Enfants Sauvages through Roadrunner. It also featured a 60-page hardcover book featuring photographs of the band taken around the world in the course of the last few years of their touring, spanning over 150 shows.

Reception

Critical reception 

L'Enfant Sauvage was met with universal acclaim from music critics. At Metacritic (a review aggregator site which assigns a normalized rating out of 100 from music critics), based on 10 critics, the album has received a score of 86/100, which indicates "universal acclaim".

Writing for the BBC, Raziq Rauf wrote that "This is as flawless an extreme metal album as you'll hear, in 2012 or any other year", adding that "Gojira is one of the finest bands of our generation, and with L'Enfant Sauvage they've created another album to suit such a reputation." In his review of the album for The Guardian, Dom Lawson gave the album a perfect rating, writing that "Their fifth studio album sustains their trademark blend of unfathomable heaviness, structural invention and ecological-cum-existential poetry while subtly enhancing its dramatic and emotional impact", concluding that "overall this is a ferociously original piece of work that reaches its electrifying zenith on The Gift of Guilt: six minutes of sledgehammer sorrow built from riffs that sound like warning shots fired from the planet's doomed and turbulent core. This is metal taken to a higher plane of brilliance."

Accolades

Commercial performance 
The album sold almost over 11,000 copies in the United States in its first week of release to land at position No. 34 on The Billboard 200 chart. In comparison, the band's previous CD, The Way of All Flesh, opened with 4,200 units back in 2008 to land at No. 138. It also reached No. 17 digitally in France.

It peaked at No. 6 on the Top Hard Rock Albums chart and No. 13 on the Top Rock Albums chart.

Track listing

Personnel
Adapted from AllMusic.

Gojira 
 Joe Duplantier – vocals, rhythm guitar
 Christian Andreu – lead guitar
 Jean-Michel Labadie – bass
 Mario Duplantier – drums

Additional 
 UE Nastasi - mastering
 Edward O'Dowd - design
 Paul Suarez - engineer
 Josh Wilbur - engineer, mixing, producer
 Gabrielle Duplantier - photography

Charts

References

Gojira (band) albums
2012 albums
Roadrunner Records albums